The Schleinitz Range is a mountain range in north-central part of New Ireland, Papua New Guinea. Highest point of the mountains is at 1,481 m. As are other mountain ranges in Papua New Guinea it is home to many rare species of fauna and flora and is highly biodiverse and covered in thick rainforest.

This range was named after German viceadmiral  (1834-1910).

References

External links 
  

Mountain ranges of Papua New Guinea